The Endgame is an American crime drama thriller television series that premiered on NBC on February 21, 2022. The series is created by Nicholas Wootton and Jake Coburn. In May 2022, the series was canceled after one season.

Premise
In this heist drama, criminal mastermind Elena Federova squares off against principled FBI agent Val Turner.

Cast

Main

 Morena Baccarin as Elena Federova
 Ryan Michelle Bathé as FBI Special Agent Val Turner
 Costa Ronin as Sergey Vodianov
 Jordan Johnson-Hinds as FBI Special Agent Anthony Flowers
 Mark Damon Espinoza as FBI Director Rogelio Réal
 Noah Bean as FBI Assistant Director in Charge Patrick Doak
 Kamal Bolden as Owen Turner

Recurring

 Karl Josef Co as Louie
 Massiel Mordan as Rona

Production
On April 21, 2021, The Untitled Nick Wootton/Jake Coburn Project was given a pilot order by NBC. It was created by Nicholas Wootton and Jake Coburn who were expected to executive produce alongside Julie Plec and Emily Cummins. Wootton also wrote the pilot. On September 21, 2021, NBC ordered The Endgame to series. Justin Lin and Andrew Schneider were added as executive producers. Lin also directed the pilot. Universal Television, Nicholas Wootton Productions, Jake Coburn Productions, Inc., My So-Called Company, and Perfect Storm Entertainment are the production companies involved with producing the series. Upon the series order, Morena Baccarin, Ryan Michelle Bathé, Kamal Angelo Bolden, Costa Ronin, Noah Bean, Jordan Johnson-Hinds, and Mark D. Espinoza were cast in starring roles. On November 18, 2021, Karl Josef Co and Massiel Mordan were added to the cast. The series premiered on February 21, 2022. On May 12, 2022, NBC canceled the series after one season.

Episodes

Reception

Critical response

On review aggregator website Rotten Tomatoes, the series holds a 33% approval rating based on 12 reviews, with an average rating of 5.4/10. The website's critics consensus reads, "While Morena Baccarin's vampish performance is commendably campy, The Endgame is too contrived and silly to justify its labyrinthine structure." On Metacritic, the series has a score of 44 out of 100, based on 7 reviews, indicating "mixed or average reviews".

Ratings

References

External links
 
 

2020s American crime drama television series
2022 American television series debuts
2022 American television series endings
American thriller television series
English-language television shows
NBC original programming
Television series about the Federal Bureau of Investigation
Television shows filmed in New York (state)
Television shows set in New York City
Television series by Universal Television
Works about the Russian Mafia